Titan FC events is a list of events held and scheduled by the Titan Fighting Championships. A mixed martial arts organization based at Pompano Beach, Florida.

List

Scheduled events

Past events

Events Locations 

 Total events: 33

These cities and towns have hosted the following numbers of Titan FC events as of Titan FC 31

 United States (33)

Kansas (22)
Kansas City, Kansas – 19
Fort Riley, Kansas – 2
Topeka, Kansas – 1
Missouri (4)
Kansas City, Missouri – 4
Oklahoma (2)
Durant, Oklahoma – 1
Newkirk, Oklahoma – 1
Alabama (1)
Mobile, Alabama – 1
Florida (1)
Tampa, Florida - 1
Massachusetts (1)
Lowell, Massachusetts - 1
North Carolina (1)
Fayetteville, North Carolina – 1
Texas (1)
Cedar Park, Texas – 1

References

Mixed martial arts events lists